Setaria pumila is a species of grass known by many common names, including yellow foxtail, yellow bristle-grass, pigeon grass, and cattail grass. It is native to Europe, but it is known throughout the world as a common weed. It grows in lawns, sidewalks, roadsides, cultivated fields, and many other places. The panicle may appear yellow or yellow-tinged.

In New Zealand S. pumila can cover 20–40% of otherwise productive dairy farming pasture causing a loss in milk production.

References

External links
Jepson Manual Treatment
Grass Manual Treatment
Kansas Wildflowers
Photo gallery

pumila
Flora of Malta